Jack Richard Face (born 2 December 1942) is an Australian former politician who was a member of the New South Wales Legislative Assembly between 1972 and 2003.

Face was born in the Newcastle suburb of Merewether and educated at Merewether Public School, Broadmeadow High School, Newcastle Technical College and the New South Wales Police Academy.

Face was the Labor member for Charlestown from 1972 to 2003.  He was the Minister for Gaming and Racing in Bob Carr's cabinet from 1995 until his retirement.

In 2004 he was found guilty of lying to the Independent Commission against Corruption (ICAC). He was fined A$2500 and given a three-year good behaviour bond.

References

Members of the New South Wales Legislative Assembly
1942 births
Living people
Australian politicians convicted of crimes
21st-century Australian politicians